is a Japanese modern pentathlete. He competed at the 1968 and 1972 Summer Olympics.

References

1944 births
Living people
Japanese male modern pentathletes
Olympic modern pentathletes of Japan
Modern pentathletes at the 1968 Summer Olympics
Modern pentathletes at the 1972 Summer Olympics
Sportspeople from Hiroshima